BAP Abtao (SS-42) is an  of the Peruvian Navy. The vessel which was originally named BAP Tiburón ("Shark"), was constructed by the American Electric Boat company in the United States and launched in 1953. The Abtao class were the last submarines constructed by the United States for the export market. The submarine entered service in 1954 and by presidential decree, was renamed Abtao for the battle during the Chincha Islands War. 

Abtao was taken out of service in 1999 and converted into a museum ship located in Lima, Peru. Abtao was the first museum ship in Latin America.

Design and description
The Abtao class were a modified version of the United States World War II  design.

Abtao had a maximum speed of  when surfaced and  submerged.

Abtao was armed with six  torpedo tubes with four located in the bow and two aft. Two vessels of the class, Abtao had a /25 caliber gun mounted abaft the sail. The gun was manually sighted. The submarine was equipped with SS-2A radar and BQR-3 and BQA-1A sonar. In 1981, Abtaos batteries were replaced and following that, Thomson Sintra Eledone active/passive intercept sonar was installed. The submarine had a complement of 40 officers and ratings.

Construction and career
The Peruvian Navy initially ordered two submarines from Electric Boat on 8 December 1951 based on the United States Navy's Mackerel design. The two submarines, Tiburón ("Shark") and Lobo ("Wolf") were laid down on 12 May 1952 at the shipyard in Groton, Connecticut, United States. Tiburón was launched on 27 October 1953 and commissioned on 20 February 1954. Tiburón and the rest of this class was the last submarines constructed by the United States for the export market. A decree in April 1957 by the President of Peru, Manuel Prado Ugarteche, ordered that the names of the vessels be changed to those of famous Peruvian battles. Tiburón  was renamed Abtao for the battle in the Chincha Islands War. Originally assigned pennant number 5, in 1959 Abtao was designated SS-2, then renumbered SS-42 in 1960.

Abtao underwent a refit at Groton in 1965. In 1988, Abtao took part in the rescue of the crew of the submarine  which had sunk after a collision with the fishing vessel Kiowa Maru. Abtao was removed from service on 10 May 1999 and placed in reserve. The ship was removed from naval service on 10 March 2000 and converted into a museum ship on 28 January 2004 in Lima, Peru due to the work of the Peruvian Navy, the Provincial Council of Callao, and the Marina Yacht Club SA Entities. Abtaos opening as a museum was the first time a ship had been turned into a museum in Latin America.

See also 
 Museum ships of the Peruvian Navy

Citations

References
 
 
 
 
 
 

1953 ships
Submarines of the Peruvian Navy
Museum ships in Peru
Ships built in Groton, Connecticut